CGS Margaret was the first vessel to be built specifically for the Canadian Customs Preventive Service. Delivered in 1914, she was transferred to the Royal Canadian Navy and served as HMCS Margaret during the First World War. Following the war, Margaret was returned to the Customs Preventive Service spending most of the 1920s intercepting smugglers during American Prohibition. In 1932 the ship was transferred to the Royal Canadian Mounted Police. The ship was sold shortly thereafter, and was subsequently acquired by the Brazilian Navy and renamed Rio Branco, utilized as a hydrographic survey vessel. Rio Branco was discarded in 1958.

Description
The ship had a gross register tonnage (GRT) of 756 tons. Due to the unique design of the guns, the amount of ammunition was limited. The ship was later converted to use oil fuel and in 1927, was rearmed with one 6-pounder gun and 17 rifles.

Service history

Construction and First World War
CGS Margaret was constructed by Thornycroft's Woolston Works at their yard in Southampton, United Kingdom in 1914 and delivered to the Department of Customs at Halifax, Nova Scotia in April 1914. The first ship ordered specifically for the Customs and Preventative Service (CPS), armed with her two 6-pounder guns, she was suitable for a patrol vessel, and given her similarities to a 1907 coastal defence cruiser that was never built, Margaret may in fact have been ordered in anticipation of war with Germany. CGS Margaret became HMCS Margaret when she was transferred, together with CGS Canada, to the Royal Canadian Navy on 4 August 1914 following the outbreak of the First World War. In CPS service, the ship was replaced by chartered ships. Commissioned on 3 February 1915, the CPS crew were given the option of joining the Royal Canadian Navy. All of them declined and in order to keep the ship active, the Royal Canadian Navy was forced to borrow personnel from the British Royal Navy until sufficient Canadian personnel could be found. Margaret was used as an escort and patrol vessel in Atlantic coastal waters during the war, and was one of the first vessels in which Rear Admiral Leonard W. Murray served as a midshipman. The ship was initially assigned to patrol the approaches to Halifax and employed until June, when the ship was laid up at Halifax to re-tube a boiler. In 1916, Margaret began patrolling the Cabot Strait. On 13 December, Margaret was sent to search for the disabled  which had been damaged in a storm. Grilse was able to make Shelburne, Nova Scotia under her own power, but Margaret was tasked with towing the damaged vessel to Halifax for refit.

In 1917, Margaret returned to her patrol route in the Gulf of St. Lawrence, based again at Sydney. Margaret was alongside at Dockyard Jetty 2 in Halifax Harbour during the Halifax Explosion. She broke her moorings and suffered minor damage, while two of her crew were killed ashore. Commander Walter Hose, the commander of the Canadian Atlantic Patrol, sought to rearm the ship with more capable  guns positioned aft, but this never came to pass. In 1918, the appearance of German U-boats along the east coast of North America led to the creation of coastal convoys. In August, Margaret was tasked with patrolling east of the Magdalen Islands. In September, Margaret and Canada escorted HC convoys from Gaspé, Quebec through the Strait of Belle Isle.

Interwar Canadian service
Following the end of the war, HMCS Margaret was returned to the CPS in December 1918, and carried out her first patrols in the Gulf of St. Lawrence and on the East Coast of Canada in early 1919. Based at Gaspé, the ship's patrol was later extended into the Northumberland Strait as alcohol smuggling increased during American Prohibition. Due to the limits of CPS authority, all of the seizures made by Margaret between 1921 and 1923 were disallowed. However, in 1923, a memorandum by the department declared the Gulf of St. Lawrence and its estuaries and bays Canadian waters and vessels within the  limit would be subject to Canadian law. By October, Margaret and fellow CPS ship  had intercepted eleven vessels. In 1932, the CPS was absorbed by the Royal Canadian Mounted Police (RCMP), and the service's personnel and ships were transferred to the RCMP's Marine Section.

Brazilian service
Following the transfer of the CPS's responsibilities to the RCMP in 1932, the number of personnel was reduced and some former CPS vessels were discarded. Margaret was among the CPS vessels sold later that year as a result of these cutbacks. Taken over by the Brazilian government, she was renamed Rio Branco and was converted to a hydrographic survey ship for the Brazilian Navy in 1935. Rio Branco was discarded in 1958.

Notes

Citations

Sources

External links
 World War 1 Canadian Ship Listing - Converted civilian vessels

Patrol vessels of the Royal Canadian Navy
World War I naval ships of Canada
1914 ships
Auxiliary ships of the Royal Canadian Navy
Service vessels of Canada
Canadian Government Ship